"Moving On" is a song written and produced by Taio Cruz, and was the second single taken from his debut studio album Departure (2008). "Moving On" became his second top thirty hit, peaking at number 26 on the UK Singles Chart, outpeaking his debut single by three places. It did not, however, spend as long inside the UK top 75 as previous single "I Just Wanna Know", which had a six-week chart run, in comparison to the four-week chart run for "Moving On".

Reception
In context of the review of "Departure", Digital Spy stated:

Track listing
 CD single and Digital download
 "Moving On" (Radio Edit) - 3:13
 "Moving On" (Alex's Club Remix) - 5:44
 "Moving On" (Kardinal Beats Remix) - 3:47
 "Moving On" (P*Nut Remix) - 4:17

 Digital download - Amazon exclusive
 "Moving On" (Wookie Acoustic Mix) - 3:34

Charts

References

2007 singles
Taio Cruz songs
2007 songs
Songs written by Taio Cruz
Island Records singles